Alan Kristmanson (born 5 November 1961) is a Canadian basketball player. He competed in the men's tournament at the 1988 Summer Olympics.

References

External links
 
 Simon Fraser HOF profile

1961 births
Living people
Basketball players at the 1988 Summer Olympics
Basketball people from British Columbia
Canadian expatriate basketball people in New Zealand
Canadian men's basketball players
Olympic basketball players of Canada
Simon Fraser Clan men's basketball players
Basketball players from Vancouver
Vancouver Grizzlies announcers